Pablo Popovitch (born September 9, 1979) is a Brazilian jiu-jitsu practitioner, mixed martial artist and a 4th degree black belt under Jorge Popovitch.

Biography
Pablo Popovitch became involved in BJJ as a 4-year-old. Born in Rio de Janeiro, Popovitch began instruction at Barra Gracie School, where his teachers were the Machado brothers, Rigan, Carlos and Jean Jaques.your brother Jairo, and  sisters Krisla and Kyria,  He and his family moved to Florida in 1995 when Pablo was 15. He continued to study BJJ under Grand Master Carlson Gracie.
His most notable achievement was winning the ADCC Submission Wrestling World Championship in 2009, taking first place in the 66–77 kg by defeating 4-time ADCC Champion Marcelo Garcia. He has also won the 2010 BJJ No-Gi World Jiu-Jitsu Championship 84 kg and absolute Championship(Closed Absolute with team Mates Roberto " Cyborg" Abreu and Buchecha). The 2007 BJJ No-Gi World Jiu-Jitsu Championship 84 kg, the 2010 Pan American No Gi Jiu-Jitsu 84 kg and absolute Championship. the 2008 Pan American No Gi Jiu-Jitsu 84 kg Championship., The Grapplers Quest 14 Times. He is a North American Grappling Association (N.A.G.A) superfight 10X champion and twice was an ADCC Finalist in the years of 2005 & 2007.
Popovitch defeated Jeff Savoy in his Mixed Martial Arts debut by Submission due to strikes, in the 2nd round at the Rock and Rumble 3, June 4 in South Florida.

Special awards
In recognition of his extraordinary contributions to the sport of grappling, Pablo Popovitch was inducted to the Grappling Hall Of Fame, February 13, 2010, by the North American Grappling Association. Also In 2010 he was awarded the "BJJ Fighter of the Year Award" by Gracie Mag – A magazine specialized in Brazilian Jiu Jitsu.

Tournament results

ADCC World Submission Wrestling Championships
ADCC 2011
Absolute: 2nd place
-88 kg: 3rd place
ADCC 2009
-77 kg: 1st place
ADCC 2007
-77 kg: 2nd place
ADCC 2005
-77 kg: 2nd place

CBJJ No-Gi World Championships
 2012
Black Belt 84 kg: Champion
 2011
Black Belt 84 kg: Finalist
 2010
Black Belt 84 kg: Champion
Black Belt Absolute: Champion
 2007
Black Belt 79 kg: Champion

CBJJ No-Gi Pan American Championships
 2012
Black Belt 84 kg: 3rd Place
Black Belt Absolute: Champion
 2010
Black Belt 84 kg: Champion
Black Belt Absolute: Champion
 2008
Black Belt 84 kg: Champion

Grapplers Quest
 2010
Ufc expo Superfight : Champion
 2009
Pro All Star  84 kg: Champion
South East Open Weight: Champion
South East 84 kg: Champion
 2007
Pro All Star 84 kg: Champion
 2004
5th Grapplers Quest West 84 kg: Champion
Pro All Star 84 kg: Finalist
 2003
Pro All Star 84 kg: Champion

Copa América
 2010
No Gi Absolute: Champion
Gi Absolute: Champion

VIC 3(Vivaceteam International Championship)
VIC 3-2010
74–84 kg: Champion
Absolute: Champion

N.A.G.A
 2007
Advanced 84 kg: Champion
 2005
Superfight: Champion
Superfight: champion
 2004
Superfight: Champion
Superfight: Champion
 2002
Superfight: Champion
 2001
Superfight: Champion
 2000
Advanced 84 kg: champion

Pro Jiu-Jitsu Championship
 2009
Black Belt 84 kg: Champion

Atlantic Cup
Superfight: Champion

NE Grappling Challenge III
Pro Division 84 kg: Champion

Texas Submission Championship
Pro Division 84 kg: Champion

Casca Grossa Championship
Pro Division 84 kg: Champion

Music City Submission Championship
Pro Division 84 kg: Champion

FFC Grappling Open
Pro Division 84 kg: Champion

World Extreme Shoot Challenge
XII Superfight: champion
XI Superfight: Champion

Sport Combat championships II
Pro Division 84 kg: Champion

Pablo Popovitch has built one of the most notable Brazilian Jiu-Jitsu training studios in the Southern United States.  Some of the sports most decorated athletes have spent significant amounts of time on Pablo's mats training with him at his facility.  Pablo has built up a reputation of being a fierce grappling competitor, always receiving a medal in any competition he chooses to enter, despite injury.  Most recently, Pablo trained with AJ Souza, Jared McLuskey and his other students in order to prepare for ADCC 2013.  Unfortunately, an aggravated preexisting injury kept Pablo from competing in his third place match against Keenan Cornelius.

Submission grappling record 

|-
|  style="text-align:center; border-style:none none solid solid; background:#f0f0f0;"|Result
|  style="text-align:center; border-style:none none solid solid; background:#f0f0f0;"|Opponent
|  style="text-align:center; border-style:none none solid solid; background:#f0f0f0;"|Method
|  style="text-align:center; border-style:none none solid solid; background:#f0f0f0;"|Event
|  style="text-align:center; border-style:none none solid solid; background:#f0f0f0;"|Date
|  style="text-align:center; border-style:none none solid solid; background:#f0f0f0;"|Round
|  style="text-align:center; border-style:none none solid solid; background:#f0f0f0;"|Time
|  style="text-align:center; border-style:none none solid solid; background:#f0f0f0;"|Notes
|-
|Win|| Marcel Golcalves|| Toe hold || MMA Expo (Absolute Division)|| 2012|| || || Final round, wins the MMA Expo Absolute Division
|-
|Win|| Ricardo Rezende|| Foot Lock || MMA Expo (Absolute Division)|| 2012|| || || Semi-finals
|-
|Win|| Yury Villafort|| Arm Bar || MMA Expo (Absolute Division)|| 2012|| || || Opening round
|-
|Win|| Romulo Barral|| Points || World No-Gi Championship (-84 kg Division)|| 2012|| || || Finals, 2012 World No gi Champion
|-
|Loss|| Ezra Lenon|| Points || World No-Gi Championship (-84 kg Division)|| 2012|| || || Semi-finals
|-
|Win|| Augusto Antunes|| Points || World No-Gi Championship (-84 kg Division)|| 2012|| || || Opening round
|-
|Win|| Lucas Lepri|| Points || Pan Jiu-Jitsu No-Gi Championship (Absolute Division)|| 2012|| || || Finals, 2012 Pan Am No Gi Absolute Champion
|-
|Win|| Diego Pereira de Santana|| Points || Pan Jiu-Jitsu No-Gi Championship (Absolute Division)|| 2012|| || || Semi-finals
|-
|Win|| Oliver Geeddes|| Submission || Pan Jiu-Jitsu No-Gi Championship (Absolute Division)|| 2012|| || || Opening round
|-
|Loss|| Andre Galvao||Toe Hold || ADCC 2011 (Absolute Division)|| 2011|| || ||Finals,  2011 ADCC Absolute Second Place
|-
|Win|| Xande Ribeiro|| Judges Decision|| ADCC 2011 (Absolute Division)|| 2011|| || ||Semi-finals
|-
|Win|| Victor Estima|| Points || ADCC 2011 (Absolute Division)|| 2011|| || ||Quarter-finals
|-
|Win|| Janne-Pekka|| Points || ADCC 2011 (Absolute Division)|| 2011|| || ||Opening round 
|-
|Win|| Rafael Lovato Jr.|| Points || ADCC 2011 (-88 kg Division)|| 2011|| || ||Bronze medal match
|-
|Loss|| Andre Galvao|| Points|| ADCC 2011 (-88 kg Division)|| 2011|| || ||Semi-finals
|-
|Win|| Sergio Moraes|| Points || ADCC 2011 (-88 kg Division)|| 2011|| || ||Quarter-finals
|-
|Win|| Zbigniew Tyszka|| Points || ADCC 2011 (-88 kg Division)|| 2011|| || ||Opening round
|-
|Win|| Flavio Almeida|| Points || World No Gi championship (Absolute Division)|| 2010|| || ||Wins the 2010 World No Gi Absolute(Closed Division w Team Mate Roberto" Cyborg" Abreu and Marcus Buchecha)  
|-
|Win|| Ben Baxter|| Submission Rear Naked Choke || World No Gi championship (Absolute Division)|| 2010|| || ||
|-
|Win|| Daniel Moraes||  Points(6-0) || World No Gi championship (Medium Heavyweight Division)|| 2010|| || ||Wins the 2010 World No Gi Championship
|-
|Win|| Murilo Santana|| Points || World No Gi championship || 2010|| || ||
|-
|Win|| Eduardo Milioli "Duda"|| Points || World No Gi championship|| 2010|| || ||
|-
|Win|| Steve Ramos|| Submission Kimura  || Copa América (No Gi Absolute Division)|| 2010|| || ||Wins the 2010 Copa América  No Gi Absolute (Closed Division w Team Mate Vagner Rocha)  
|-
|Win|| Roger Kessler|| Submission Kimura  || Copa América (No Gi Absolute Division)|| 2010|| || || 
|-
|Win|| Roger Kessler|| Submission Kimura  || Copa América (Gi Absolute Division)|| 2010|| || || Wins the 2010 Copa América Gi Absolute (Closed Division w Team Mate Vagner Rocha)
|- 
|Win|| Caio Terra|| Submission Rear Naked Choke  || Pan American Jiu-Jitsu Championship (Absolute Division)|| 2010|| || || Wins the 2010 Pan American Jiu-Jitsu 
|-
|Win|| Marcelo Pereira||  Submission Kimura  || Pan American Jiu-Jitsu Championship (Absolute Division)|| 2010|| || ||
|-
|Win|| Leonardo Ferreira|| Submission Kimura  || Pan American Jiu-Jitsu Championship (Medium Heavyweight Division)|| 2010|| || || Wins the 2010 Pan American Jiu-Jitsu
|-
|Win|| Nakapan Phungephorn|| Points(4-0)  || Pan American Jiu-Jitsu Championship (Medium Heavyweight Division)|| 2010|| || ||
|-
|Win|| Lucas Lepri|| Points(2-0)  || Grapplers Quest Ufc Superfight (Middleweight Division)|| 2010|| || || Wins Superfight 
|-
|Win|| Baki Mir|| Submission Kimura  || Vic 3 (Middleweight Division)|| 2010|| || || Wins Vic 3 84 kg 
|-
|Win|| Benaissa Au|| Submission Kimura  || Vic 3 (Middleweight Division)|| 2010|| || || 
|-
|Win|| Thomas Loubersanes||  || Vic 3 (Middleweight Division)|| 2010|| || ||
|-
|Win|| N/A||  Points || Vic 3 (Middleweight Division)|| 2010|| || ||
|-
|Win|| Marcelo Garcia|| Points (3-2) || ADCC Submission Wrestling World Championship (Middleweight Division)|| 2009|| || || Wins the ADCC 
|-
|Win|| Gregor Gracie|| Points (3-0) || ADCC Submission Wrestling World Championship (Middleweight Division)|| 2009|| || ||
|-
|Win|| Ben Askren|| Submission Footlock || ADCC Submission Wrestling World Championship (Middleweight Division)|| 2009|| || ||
|-
|Win|| Don Ortega|| Submission Rear naked Choke || ADCC Submission Wrestling World Championship (Middleweight Division)|| 2009|| || ||
|-
|Win|| Sam Mccoy|| Points (11-0) || Grapplers Quest (Open Division)|| 2009|| || || Wins the Grapplers Quest
|-
|Win|| Robby D'Onoforio|| Submission Mount Choke || Grapplers Quest (Open Division)|| 2009|| || ||
|-
|Win|| Tom Manelski|| Points (8-0) || Grapplers Quest (Middleweight Division)|| 2009|| || || Wins the Grapplers Quest
|-
|Win|| Jorge Patino|| Points (8-0) || Grapplers Quest (Middleweight Division)|| 2009|| || ||
|-
|Win|| Jo Jo Guarin|| Submission Rear Naked Choke || Grapplers Quest (Middleweight Division)|| 2009|| || ||
|-
|Win|| Lucas Lepri|| Advantage || Pro Jiu-Jitsu Championship (Middleweight Division)|| 2009|| ||   ||  Wins the Pro Jiu-Jitsu
|-
|Win|| Jorge Patino|| Submission Rear naked Choke || Pro Jiu-Jitsu Championship (Middleweight Division)|| 2009|| ||   ||
|-
|Win|| Derek Leyrer|| Points  || Pro Jiu-Jitsu Championship (Middleweight Division)|| 2009|| ||   ||
|-
|Win|| Tarsis Humphries|| Points (2-0) || Pan American Jiu-Jitsu Championship (Medium Heavyweight Division)|| 2008|| || || Wins the 2008 Pan American Jiu-Jitsu
|-
|Win|| Mike Jaramillo|| Points (26-0) || Pan American Jiu-Jitsu Championship (Medium Heavyweight Division)|| 2008|| || ||
|-
|Win|| Daniel Moraes|| Points (2-0) ||  World Jiu-Jitsu Championship (Middleweight Division)|| 2007|| || || Wins the 2007 World Jiu-Jitsu Championship
|-
|Win|| Lucas Leite|| Points (12-2) || World Jiu-Jitsu Championship (Middleweight Division)|| 2007|| ||   ||
|-
|Win|| Eder Persiliano|| Submission Rear naked Choke || World Jiu-Jitsu Championship (Middleweight Division)|| 2007|| ||   ||
|-
|Loss|| Marcelo Garcia||North South Choke  || ADCC Submission Wrestling World Championship (Middleweight Division)|| 2007|| || ||  2007 ADCC Finalist
|-
|Win|| Andre Galvao|| Points (6-1) || ADCC Submission Wrestling World Championship (Middleweight Division)|| 2007|| ||   ||
|-
|Win|| Daisuke Sugie|| Submission Mount Choke || ADCC Submission Wrestling World Championship (Middleweight Division)|| 2007|| ||   ||
|-
|Win|| Eric Dahberg|| Points (8-0) || ADCC Submission Wrestling World Championship (Middleweight Division)|| 2007|| ||   ||
|-
|Win|| Saulo Ribeiro|| Points (2-0) || Grapplers Quest (Middleweight Division)|| 2007|| ||   || Wins The Grapplers Quest
|-
|Win|| Sean Splanger|| Points (2-0) || Grapplers Quest (Middleweight Division)|| 2007|| ||   ||
|-
|Win|| Gary Grate|| Points (5-0) || Grapplers Quest (Middleweight Division)|| 2007|| ||   ||
|-
|Win|| Manoel Soares|| Submission Rear Naked Choke || N.A.G.A (Middleweight Division)|| 2007|| ||   || Wins the N.A.G.A
|-
|Win|| Jason Keaton|| Submission Mount Choke || Atlantic Cup Superfight (Middleweight Division)|| 2007|| ||   || Wins the Superfight
|-
|Loss|| Marcelo Garcia||Wrist Lock  || ADCC Submission Wrestling World Championship (Middleweight Division)|| 2005|| || ||  2005 ADCC Finalist
|-
|Win|| Jake Shields|| Points (5-0) || ADCC Submission Wrestling World Championship (Middleweight Division)|| 2005|| ||   ||
|-
|Win|| Roan Carneiro|| Points (2-0) || ADCC Submission Wrestling World Championship (Middleweight Division)|| 2005|| ||   ||
|-
|Win|| Renzo Gracie|| Points (4-0) || ADCC Submission Wrestling World Championship (Middleweight Division)|| 2005|| ||   ||
|-
|Win|| Luke Rineheart|| Points (8-0) || Naga Superfight (Middleweight Division)|| 2005|| ||   || Wins the Superfight
|-
|Win|| Steven Haigh|| Kimura  || NE Grappling Challenge III (Middleweight Division)|| 2005|| ||   || Wins NE Grappling Challenge III
|-
|Win|| Andrew Smith|| Kimura  || NE Grappling Challenge III (Middleweight Division)|| 2005|| ||   || 
|-
|Win|| Len Sonia|| Points (10-0)  || NE Grappling Challenge III (Middleweight Division)|| 2005|| ||   || 
|-
|Win|| Marcus Avellan|| Submission Rear naked Choke || Grapplers Quest (Middleweight Division)|| 2004|| ||   ||  Wins The Grapplers Quest
|-
|Win|| Jake Shields|| Points (11-0) || Grapplers Quest (Middleweight Division)|| 2004|| ||   ||
|-
|Win|| Alex Crispim|| Points (4-0) || Grapplers Quest (Middleweight Division)|| 2004|| ||   ||
|-
|Win|| Marcus Avellan|| Points (14-0) || Naga Superfight (Middleweight Division)|| 2004|| ||   || Wins the Superfight
|-
|Win|| Tyrone Glover|| Points (4-0) || Naga Superfight (Middleweight Division)|| 2004|| ||   || Wins The Superfight
|-
|Win|| Diego Sanchez|| Points (6-0)  || Texas Submission Open (Middleweight Division)|| 2004|| ||   || Wins the Texas Submission Open
|-
|Loss|| Diego Sanchez|| Advantage  || Grapplers Quest (Middleweight Division)|| 2004|| ||   || Finalist of the 2004 Grapplers Quest
|-
|Win|| Rob Kahn|| Points (15-0)  || Grapplers Quest (Middleweight Division)|| 2004|| ||   ||
|-
|Win|| Tony Torres Aponte|| Submission Kimura || Grapplers Quest (Middleweight Division)|| 2004|| ||   ||
|-
|Win|| Efrain Ruiz|| Points (4-0) || Casca Grossa Submission Championship (Middleweight Division)|| 2004|| ||   ||  Wins The Casca Grossa
|-
|Win|| Steve Headden|| Points (4-0) || Casca Grossa Submission Championship (Middleweight Division)|| 2004|| ||   ||
|-
|Win|| Nakapan Phungephorn|| Points (5-0) || Grapplers Quest (Middleweight Division)|| 2003|| ||   || Wins The Grapplers Quest
|-
|Win|| Kenny Florian|| Points (2-0) || Grapplers Quest (Middleweight Division)|| 2003|| ||   ||
|-
|Win|| Anthony Tolone|| Points (4-0) || Grapplers Quest (Middleweight Division)|| 2003|| ||   ||
|-
|Loss|| Vítor Ribeiro|| Advantage  || ADCC Submission Wrestling World Championship (Middleweight Division)|| 2003|| ||   ||
|-
|Win|| Marcio Feitosa|| Points (4-0) || ADCC Submission Wrestling World Championship (Middleweight Division)|| 2003|| ||   ||
|-
|Win|| Antonio McKee|| Points (1-0) || North American ADCC Submission Wrestling World Championship (Middleweight Division)|| 2003|| ||   ||  Wins The ADCC Trials
|-
|Win|| Shawn Williams|| Points (5-0) || North American ADCC Submission Wrestling World Championship (Middleweight Division)|| 2003|| ||   ||
|-
|Win|| Sean Spangler|| Submission Knee Bar || North American ADCC Submission Wrestling World Championship (Middleweight Division)|| 2003|| ||   ||
|-
|Win|| Alex Crispim|| Submission Kimura || Music City Submission Championship (Middleweight Division)|| 2003|| ||   ||  Wins the Music City Championship
|-
|Win|| Steve Headden|| Points (8-0) || Music City Submission Championship (Middleweight Division)|| 2003|| ||   ||
|-
|Win|| Nakapan Phungephorn|| Points (5-0) || N.A.G.A Superfight (Middleweight Division)|| 2003|| ||   ||
|-
|Win|| Shanne Dunn|| Points (12-2) || FFBJJ Florida State Jiu-Jitsu Championship  (Middleweight Division)|| 2001|| ||   || Wins The FCC
|-
|Win|| Hermes França|| Submission Kimura || FFBJJ Florida State Jiu-Jitsu Championship (Middleweight Division)|| 2001|| ||   ||
|-
|Win|| Mat Santos|| Submission Arm Bar || N.A.G.A Superfight (Middleweight Division|| 2000|| ||   ||  Wins the Superfight
|-
|Win|| Efrain Ruiz|| Submission Arm Bar || SPORT COMBAT CHAMPIONSHIPS II|| 1999|| ||   ||  Wins the KWA
|-
|Win|| Bernardo Magalhães|| Submission Arm Bar || SPORT COMBAT CHAMPIONSHIPS II|| 1999|| ||   ||

Mixed martial arts record

References

External links
Pablo Popovitch Brazilian Jiu-jitsu Center Fort Lauderdale

Tournament Results – Official Homepages
 ADCC 2007 Results
 ADCC 2005 Results
 ADCC 2003 Results
 CBJJ Tournament Results

1979 births
Living people
Brazilian practitioners of Brazilian jiu-jitsu
People awarded a black belt in Brazilian jiu-jitsu
Brazilian people of Russian descent
Brazilian male mixed martial artists
Welterweight mixed martial artists
Mixed martial artists utilizing Brazilian jiu-jitsu
Sportspeople from Rio de Janeiro (city)
Brazilian emigrants to the United States
World No-Gi Brazilian Jiu-Jitsu Championship medalists